The 18th Parliament of Jordan was elected at the 2016 Jordanian general election. 130 members were elected and had the right to sit in the National Assembly of Jordan.

The parliament was opened on 7 November 2016 when King Abdullah II inaugurated the first regular session of the new parliament with a speech from the throne. The King dissolved the parliament on 27 September 2020.

List of members 
The names of the council members are in alphabetical order:

 Ibtisam Youssef Khalil Al-Nawafleh
 Ibrahim Hussein Al-Ali Bani Hani
 Ibrahim Abdel-Razzaq Suleiman Abu Al-Ezz
 Ibrahim Mahfouz Atallah Al-Badour
 Ibrahim Mohammed Salman Abu Sayed
 Ibrahim Musharraf Al-Radwan Al-Quran
 Ahmed Ibrahim Salama Al-Hmisat
 Ahmed Hassan Suleiman Al-Fraihat
 Ahmed Salama Faleh Al-Lozy
 Ahmed Mohammed Ali Al-Safadi
 Intisar Badi Mustafa Hegazy
 Andrei Murad Mahmoud Abdel-Jalil Hawari
 Insaf Ahmed Salama Al-Khawaldeh
 Ahmed Suleiman Awad Al-Raqab
 Barakat Kamel Abdulkarim Al-Nimr Almhairat Al-Abadi
 Tamer Shaher Syed Mohamed Bino
 Jamal Issa Jeries Gammoh
 Jawdat Ibrahim Nasir Al-Darabah
 Habis Rakad Khalif Al Shabib
 Habis Sami Mithqal Al-Fayez
 Hazem Saleh Saleh Al-Majali
 Hassan Asri Abdul Qader Al Saud
 Hassan Mufleh Auda Allah Al-Ajarmeh
 Hosni Mohamed Fendi Al Sheyab
 Hussein Attia Musa Al-Qaisi
 Hammoud Ibrahim Ahmed Al-Zawahra
 The life of Hussein Ali Massimi
 Khaled Ramadan Mohamed Awad
 Khaled Zaher Al-Abed Al-Fanatah
 Khaled Abdel-Razzaq Musa Al-Hiyari
 Khaled Mahmoud Mohamed Al-Bakkar Al-Bishtawi
 Khaled Musa Issa Al Abdullah Abu Hassan
 Khalil Hussein Khalil Attia
 Khamis Hussein Khalil Attia
 Khair Abdullah Ayad Abu Sa'ilek
 Dima Mohamed Tariq Tahboub
 Rashid Mohammed Suleiman Al-Shuha
 Raed Aqleh Mufleh Al-Khazaleh
 Raja Jazaa Ali Al-Sarayrah
 Rasmiya Ali Awad Al-Kaabneh
 Ramadan Muhammad Falah Al-Hunaiti
 Randa Abata Abdullah Al Shaar
 Riyad Muhammad Arsan Al-Azzam
 Reem Oqla Nawash Abu Dalbouh
 Zaid Muhammad Falah Al Shawabkeh
 Zainab Hammoud Salem Al-Zubaid
 Saud Salem Ali Abu Mahfouz
 Suleiman Huwaila Eid Al-Zaben
 Shah Salem Salim Abu Shusha Al-Amarin
 Shoaib Khalaf Al Muhammed Al Shdeifat
 Saleh Sari Muhammad Abu Tayeh
 Saleh Abdulkarim Shehadeh Al-Armouti
 Good morning Freej logo
 Saddah Ahmed Mohammed Al-Habashneh
 Safaa Abdullah Mohammed Al Momani
 Fountains ask for balconies
 Tarek Sami Hanna Khoury
 Atef Youssef Saleh Al-Tarawneh
 Abdul Ali Muhammad Alyan Al-Mahsiri
 Abdul Rahman Hussain Muhammad Al-Awaysha
 Abdul Qadir Salman Nuri Al-Fishikat Al-Azaydah
 Abdul Karim Faisal Dhaifallah Al-Daghmi
 Abdullah Badi’ Muhammad Abdul-Dayem Al-Qaramas
 Abdullah Ali Odeh Akaileh
 Abdullah Ghanem Suleiman Zureikat
 Abdullah Qassem Mohammed Obeidat
 Abdel Moneim Saleh Shehadeh Al-Awdat
 Adnan Saeed Mohammed Al-Rakibat
 Aziz Muhammad Ali Salman Al-Obaidi
 His mind is ghamar moflih the customer
 Ali Khalaf Radwan Al-Hajjaj
 Ali Salem Fadel Al-Khalayleh
 Alia Odeh Nassar Abu Halil
 Omar Sobhi Shehadeh Qaraqish
 Awwad Mohammed Salman Al-Zawaida
 Issa Ali Issa Khashasnah
 Ghazi Muhammad Salem Al-Hawamleh
 Fudayl Munawwar Fudayl Al-Nahar Al-Manasir Al-Abadi
 Silver blood money Abdullah Faleh Abu Qaddoura
 Fawaz Mahmoud Mufleh Al Zoubi
 Fawzy Shaker Taima Daoud
 Faisal Nayef Gad Al-Awar
 Qusai Ahmed Abdel Hamid Al-Domaisi
 Qais Khalil Yaqoub Ziyadin
 Kamal Ahmed Mohamed Al-Zogoul
 Majed Mahmoud Hassan Qweism
 Mazen Turki Saud Al-Qadi
 Majhem Hamad Hussein Al-Suqur
 Pros of Manizil Attia Al-Sharaa
 Muhammad Jamil Muhammad Al-Zahrawi
 Muhammad Husayn Muhammad Abu Sitta al-Ayasra
 Mohammed Rashid Odeh Al-Braiseh
 Mohamed Saad Salama Al-Atayqa
 Muhammad Daif Allah Suleiman Al-Falahat
 Mohamed Abdel Fattah Mahmoud Hodeeb
 Muhammad Ali Hassan Al-Riyati
 Mohammed Nasser Salim Al Zoubi
 Muhammad Noah Ali worshiping judges
 Mahmoud Ahmed Al-Saud Al-Adwan
 Mahmoud Jamil Khalaf Al-Farahid
 Mahmoud Khalaf Hamad Al-Naimat
 Mahmoud Atallah Younes Titi
 Maram Muslim Ali Al-Hisa
 Marzouq Hamad Awad Al-Habarneh Al-Dajh
 Mustafa Ramadan Abdel Qader Yaghi
 Mustafa Abdul Rahman Mazen Al-Assaf
 Mustafa Fouad Muhammad Al-Khasawneh
 Musleh Ahmed Musa Tarawneh
 Moataz Muhammad Musa Abu Rumman
 Muflih Muhammad Muflih Al-Khazaleh
 Manal Ali Abdul Rahman Al-Damour
 Muntaha Abdel-Gawad Ahmed Al-Baoul
 Mansour Seif El-Din Mourad Sajaja
 Musa Barakat Saud Al-Zawahra
 Musa Ali Muhammad al-Wahsh
 Musa Ali Muhammad Hantash
 Nabil Kamel Ahmed Al Shishani
 Nabil Mikhail Odeh Al-Ghishan
 Nassar Hassan Salem Al-Qaisi
 Nidal Mahmoud Ahmed Al-Taani
 Nawaf Hussein Farhan Al-Nuaimat
 Nawaf Muqbel Salman Al Mualla Al Zayoud
 Hoda Hussein Mohammed Al-Atoum
 Haya Hussein Ali Muflih Al-Shibli Al-Abadi
 Haitham Jeries The return of Al-Zayadin
 Wael Moussa Youssef Razzouk
 Wasfi Hilal Abdullah Haddad
 Wafaa Saeed Yaqoub Bani Mustafa
 Yahya Muhammad Mahmoud Al-Saud
 Youssef Muhammad Yusuf Al-Jarrah

References 

Parliament of Jordan
2016 establishments in Jordan
Jordan